The 1875 Wallace by-election was a by-election held  on 6 August in the  electorate in Southland during the 5th New Zealand Parliament.

The by-election was caused by the death of incumbent MP George Webster on 15 July 1875.

The seat was won by Christopher Basstian. The other nominees were Captain Robert Cameron of Winton and Dr Monckton.

Results
The following table gives the election results:

References 

Wallace 1875
1875 elections in New Zealand
Politics of Southland, New Zealand